Brachylophora auricollis is a species of beetle in the family Cerambycidae, the only species in the genus Brachylophora.

References

Rhopalophorini
Monotypic Cerambycidae genera